Josiomorphoides dognini is a moth of the subfamily Arctiinae first described by Hering in 1925. It is found in Colombia.

References

Moths described in 1925
Arctiinae